Edinburgh Island is an island located within Coronation Gulf, south of Victoria Island, in the Kitikmeot Region, Nunavut, Canada.

Other islands in the vicinity include Doak Island, Bate Islands, Outpost Islands, Richardson Islands, Sesqui Islands, and Sisters Islands.

Edinburgh Island, PIN-DA, is a former Distant Early Warning Line and a current North Warning System site.

References

Islands of Coronation Gulf
Uninhabited islands of Kitikmeot Region
Former populated places in the Kitikmeot Region